Social Histories of Medicine is a book series from Manchester University Press which covers "all aspects of health, illness and medicine, from prehistory to the present, in every part of the world". It runs in collaboration with the Society for the Social History of Medicine and is the third series that the society has been associated with after Studies in the Social History of Medicine (1989-2009) and Studies for the Society for the Social History of Medicine. The editors of the current series are David Cantor and Keir Waddington.

Titles

2017
 Payment and Philanthropy in British Healthcare, 1918–48. George Campbell Gosling, 2017. 
 The Metamorphosis of Autism: A History of Child Development in Britain. Bonnie Evans, 2017. 
 The Politics of Vaccination: A global history. Christine Holmberg, Stuart Blume and Paul Greenough (Eds.), 2017. 
 Leprosy and Colonialism: Suriname under Dutch rule, 1750–1950. Stephen Snelders, 2017. 
 Medical Misadventure in an Age of Professionalisation, 1780–1890. Alannah Tomkins, 2017. 
 Conserving Health in Early Modern Culture: Bodies and Environments in Italy and England. Sandra Cavallo and Tessa Storey (Eds.), 2017.

2018
 Migrant Architects of the NHS: South Asian Doctors and the Reinvention of British General Practice (1940s-1980s) by Julian M. Simpson, 2018. 
 Mediterranean Quarantines, 1750–1914: Space, Identity and Power. John Chircop and Francisco Javier Martinez (Eds.). 2018. 
 Sickness, Medical Welfare and the English Poor, 1750-1834. Steven King, 2018. 
 Medical Societies and Scientific Culture in Nineteenth-Century Belgium. Joris Vandendriessche, 2018.

References 

Manchester University Press books
Series of history books
Medical books
2017 establishments in the United Kingdom